Pont-l'Abbé ("Abbot's bridge") is a commune in the Finistère department of Brittany in north-western France.

The self-styled capital of Pays Bigouden (roughly the region between the river Odet and the Bay of Audierne), Pont-l'Abbé was founded in the 14th century by a monk of Loctudy who built the first bridge across the river estuary, hence the name. The same monk also built the first castle.

Geography

Climate
Pont-l'Abbé has a oceanic climate (Köppen climate classification Cfb).

Population
Inhabitants of Pont-l'Abbé are called in French Pont-l'Abbistes.

Breton language
The municipality launched a linguistic plan concerning the Breton language through Ya d'ar brezhoneg on 2 February 2008.

In 2008, 5.08% of primary-school children attended bilingual schools.

The Fête des Brodeuses (Embroideress' Festival) in July is one of Brittany's major traditional gatherings, and includes a Breton Mass at the Notre-Dame des Carmes church.

Sights
 Pont-l'Abbé castle dates from the 14th to the 18th centuries. The "wedding" room is decorated with Mathurin Méheut pieces of art (Sainte-Marine port), Henri Sollier and Jacques Godin. Once bigger, the castle lost its ramparts during the 19th century. Today only the bridge, the keep, and a very small part of the ramparts, in the garden nearby, can be seen. The structure now serves as the city hall, housing also the Bigouden Museum, offering a fine collection of costumes and Bigouden head-dresses, 
 Church of Notre-Dame des Carmes dates from 1383-1420 in the Gothic style, with many old statues and a very fine rose window over the high altar that is considered the loveliest in Brittany.
 Church of Lambour (13th-16th century) had its roof removed in 1675 in the reign of Louis XIV in reprisal against the "Red Bonnets" uprising.
 The Monument aux Bigoudens is a masterpiece in granite by François Bazin (1931) and shows a group of four Bigoudène women and a child in traditional costume from the beginning of the 20th century, all of them thinking of a son, a father, a husband or a grandson battling the elements on the high seas.
 The Manoir de Kernuz was restored c. 1850 by the historian of Brittany, Armand du Chatellier.
 The Manoir de Kerazan located between Pont-l'Abbé and Loktudi delivers a fine art of Architecture.
 The Chapel of Treminoù (the missings in Breton) on the road to St-Jean-Trolimon, celebrates the memory of the Breton insurgents slaughtered by the French army of Louis XIV. In particular, A gathering in the last week of September and a funfair festival in the City recalls this period of Brittany's history.
 A few Menhirs still island upright around the city.
 Down to the river by the sea, lies a ria, having given its name to Loktudi (Loch Tudi, the lagoon of Saint Tudi) and Isle Tudi, which shares some beautiful sights.

International relations
Pont-l'Abbé is twinned with:
 Betanzos, Spain
 Schleiden, Germany
 Bantry, Ireland

Personalities
Vincent Riou, a yacht race Sailor who distinguished himself at Vendée Globe Challenge 2004-2005 (1st) and 2008-2009 (3rd) with act of bravery, saving Jean Le Cam's life, who was sinking near of Cape Horn.
Jérôme Kerviel, the trader formerly with Société Générale in Paris that was linked with losses of approximately €4.9 billion (US$7.16 billion) stemming from fraudulent equity index futures trading, grew up in Pont-l'Abbé.

See also
Communes of the Finistère department
François Bazin (sculptor)

References

External links

Official website 
Official Pont-l'Abbé Tourism site
Bigouden Museum of Pont-l'Abbé 
Ar Triskell, Cultures' House of Pont-l'Abbé 

Mayors of Finistère Association 

Communes of Finistère